"Want Ya!" is a song by Swedish singer Darin. The single was released both physically and digitally on 21 January 2006 as the third and final single from Darin's second studio album, Darin.

Music video
The video for "Want Ya" stars the same actress who featured in the video for previous single Who's That Girl, Darin is seen talking to her as the video starts. There are several scenes in the video that are set in a locker room and a parking lot in which Darin is seen running with a gang. Throughout the video Darin can be seen singing whilst stood before a big wheel with the lyrics to the song written in Graffiti around it. In the middle of the video there is a "dance-off" between Darin and his gang and another group which continues until the end of the video. The video is produced and directed by Mikedalica and Harakiri and is featured on the DVD Tour Videos Interview.

Track listing
CD Single: Columbia 82876 78790 2 (Sony BMG) / EAN 0828767879024
 "Want Ya!" 03:52 (George Samuelson, Thomas Granlind, Darin)
 "Who's That Girl" (The Attic Remix Radio Edit) 03:52 (Jörgen Elofsson)

Charts

References

2006 singles
2005 songs
Darin (singer) songs
Swedish dance-pop songs
Songs written by Darin (singer)
Sony BMG singles